The Last Tycoons: The Secret History of Lazard Frères & Co. is the debut book by William D. Cohan. It was released on April 3, 2007 by Doubleday. It focuses on the history of the prominent investment bank Lazard Frères. The book won the 2007 Financial Times and Goldman Sachs Business Book of the Year Award.

Author
William D. Cohan, as of 2013 an author of three New York Times best-selling books about Wall Street, is a contributing editor at Vanity Fair, and a former award-winning investigative newspaper reporter based in Raleigh, North Carolina. He worked on Wall Street for seventeen years. He spent six years at Lazard Frères in New York, then Merrill Lynch, and later became a managing director at JP Morgan Chase.

Content
Great Men
Tomorrow, the Lazard House Will Go Down
Original Sin
You Are Dealing with Greed and Power
Felix the Fixer
The Savior of New York
The Sun King
Felix for President
The Cancer is Greed
The Vicar
The Boy Wonder
The Franchise
Felix Loses It
It's a White Man's World
The Heir Apparent
All the Responsibility but None of the Authority
He Lit up a Humongous Cigar and Puffed it in our Faces for Half an Hour
Lazard May Go Down Like the Titanic
Bid-'em-up Bruce
Civil War
The End of a Dynasty

Review

—The New York Times

See also
Blue Blood and Mutiny, a book about another prominent investment bank, Morgan Stanley.
The Great Game: The Emergence of Wall Street as a World Power: 1653–2000

References

External links

Books about traders
Finance books
Books about companies
2007 non-fiction books
Business books
Doubleday (publisher) books